Linda Cahn is the founder and president of a nationwide consulting firm, Pharmacy Benefit Consultants.  The firm assists corporations, unions, government entities and insurance companies in improving their prescription coverage benefits and decreasing their prescription coverage costs.

Cahn’s expertise related to prescription coverage arises from lawsuits she filed on behalf of clients against pharmacy benefit management companies (PBMs).  In 1997, she initiated the first class action litigation against the two largest PBMs at that time—predecessor entities to Medco Health Solutions and CVS Caremark.  As a result of that litigation and several subsequent lawsuits, she gained access to hundreds of thousands of confidential PBM documents.

Cahn has testified before state legislative hearings about proposed legislation to alter PBMs’ practices and improve the prescription coverage marketplace.  She has also conducted numerous meetings about PBMs with federal and state prosecutors, officials at the Government Accounting Office and the United States Labor Department, and on Capitol Hill.

She is a graduate of Princeton University and Hofstra Law School, both with honors.

Publications
Cahn is the author of several published articles about PBMs and the prescription coverage industry, and is frequently quoted in publications as an industry expert.

Articles written by Cahn

Articles quoting Cahn
 
 
 
 
 
 
 
 
 

Pharmacy benefit management companies based in the United States
Princeton University alumni
Maurice A. Deane School of Law alumni